Don Juan y Su Bella Dama (Don Juan and his fair Lady) is an Argentine 2008–09 telenovela, created and produced by Telefe. In this telenovela, lead roles were portrayed by Joaquín Furriel and Romina Gaetani.

The telenovela was adapted in 2010 as Lena - Liebe meines Lebens by Endemol for the German television channel ZDF.

Plot
Juan meets Josefina when she almost runs over his grandmother Augusta with her bike, and falls in love with her. But Serena, his ambitious stepmother, won't stop until she makes Juan to fall in love with her.

Josefina's family is a very troubled one: her mother Alicia expulses her father Emilio from her house because he made police superintendent Eugenia Gutiérrez pregnant. Manuel, her handsome brother, feels pity for a prostitute and tries to help her, and becomes infuriated when he discovers that his malicious father Emilio raped and threatened her.

Josefina dates a Chilean man named Franco, who makes devilish plans with her father Emilio. She has to marry him  because, supposedly, he's going to die.

Cast

2008 telenovelas
2008 Argentine television series debuts
2009 Argentine television series endings
Argentine telenovelas
Telefe telenovelas
Spanish-language telenovelas